Milk is an album by Hawksley Workman, released in 2010.

Unlike his album Meat, which was released in traditional album format on January 19, 2010, Milk was planned for release as a series of digital singles, made available for sale through iTunes and Workman's own website; however, the entire album was erroneously released to iTunes' United States store, but not its Canadian store, in January 2010. The album was officially released in CD format in Canada on August 10, 2010.

Track listing
Animal Behaviour 
Who Do They Kiss
Google Jesus
Devastating
We Dance to Yesterday
Robot Heart
Suicidekick (featuring Tosha Dash of Candy Coated Killahz)
Warhol's Portrait of Gretzky
Stay Drunk and Keep Fucking
Snow Angel
Some People (featuring Shad)
Wayside
Bonus tracks:
Not Your Parents' Music
Chemical

References

Hawksley Workman albums
2010 albums